The Billings Metropolitan Statistical Area is the largest and fastest growing metropolitan area in the U.S. state of Montana.  Located in the south central portion of the state, its population was counted at 184,167 as of 2020. 

It includes Carbon, Stillwater and Yellowstone Counties in the state of Montana, and has one of the geographically largest trade, cultural, business and medical areas in the United States; this includes all of Montana.

Counties
Carbon
Stillwater
Yellowstone

Communities

Places with more than 100,000 inhabitants
Billings (Principal city)

Places with 1,000 to 10,000 inhabitants
Laurel
Lockwood (census-designated place)

Places with fewer than 500 inhabitants
Ballantine (census-designated place)
Huntley (census-designated place)
Shepherd (census-designated place)

Demographics
As of the census of 2000, there were 138,904 people, 56,149 households, and 36,926 families residing within the MSA. The racial makeup of the MSA was 93.08% White, 0.43% African American, 2.89% Native American, 0.53% Asian, 0.04% Pacific Islander, 1.22% from other races, and 1.81% from two or more races. Hispanic or Latino of any race were 3.57% of the population.

The median income for a household in the MSA was $34,433, and the median income for a family was $41,841. Males had a median income of $31,851 versus $20,756 for females. The per capita income for the MSA was $18,254.

See also
Montana census statistical areas

References

 
Yellowstone County, Montana